Mostafa Mohamed Meshaal Elnemr (born 29 March 1995) is an Egyptian basketball player for Zamalek.

Professional career
In 2018, Meshaal signed with Al Ahly, transferring from Egypt Insurance. With Al Ahly, Meshaal played in the 2018–19 Africa Basketball League.

Meshaal was on the Zamalek roster for the 2021 BAL season, where the team won the first-ever BAL championship.

BAL career statistics

|-
|style="text-align:left;background:#afe6ba;"|2021†
|style="text-align:left;"|Zamalek
| 3 || 0 || 6.3 || .667 || .667 || .167 || 1.3 || .7 || 1.3 || .0 || 3.7
|- class="sortbottom"
| style="text-align:center;" colspan="2"|Career
| 3 || 0 || 6.3 || .667 || .667 || .167 || 1.3 || .7 || 1.3 || .0 || 3.7

References

External links
RealGM profile

1986 births
Living people
Egyptian men's basketball players
Small forwards
Sportspeople from Cairo
Zamalek SC basketball players
Al Ahly basketball players
Gezira basketball players